Balaabadcheh (also Romanized as Balāābādcheh; also known as Balā Bādcheh and Balābādcheh) is a village in Lay Siyah Rural District, in the Central District of Nain County, Isfahan Province, Iran. At the 2006 census, its population was 31, in 12 families.

References 

Populated places in Nain County